Sadam Sulley (born 16 October 1996) is a Ghanaian professional footballer who plays as a forward.

Club career
Sulley signed for Legia Warsaw in 2016–17 and made his professional Fortuna Liga debut for Zemplín Michalovce against Ružomberok on 19 August 2017. Sulley was featured directly in the starting-XI of the match and was replaced by Vladislav Bragin in the 85th minute.

On 8 October 2020, he signed with Austrian club SV Ried.

References

External links
 
 Futbalnet profile
 

1996 births
Living people
People from Upper East Region
Ghanaian footballers
Ghanaian expatriate footballers
Association football forwards
Legia Warsaw players
III liga players
MFK Zemplín Michalovce players
FK Senica players
SV Ried players
Slovak Super Liga players
Austrian Football Bundesliga players
Expatriate footballers in Poland
Ghanaian expatriate sportspeople in Poland
Expatriate footballers in Slovakia
Ghanaian expatriate sportspeople in Slovakia
Expatriate footballers in Austria
Ghanaian expatriate sportspeople in Austria